William Denovan was a Scottish philosopher with an interest in theophysics and physics.  One of the earliest occurrences of the term multiverse used in reference to the physical world is due to Denovan, in a letter to Scientific American in 1873.

Selected publications 
 1889. William Denovan, "A Swedenborgian View of the Problem of Philosophy", Mind, Vol. 14, No. 54 (April 1889), pp. 216–229.

References 

Scottish philosophers